Several ships have been named  :

 , a Tachibana-class destroyer of the Imperial Japanese Navy during World War II
 JDS Nire (PF-287), a Kusu-class patrol frigate of the Japan Maritime Self-Defense Force, formerly USS Sandusky (PF-54)

Imperial Japanese Navy ship names
Japanese Navy ship names